Bingham Pond Bog is a rare undisturbed cold northern black spruce bog, highly unusual in that it lacks the usual sphagnum moss associated with bogs.  It is located near Salisbury, Connecticut, United States.  It was designated a National Natural Landmark in May 1973.

The Crimson-ringed Whiteface (Leucorrhinia glacialis) dragonflies are known to be present.

References

External links
NYNJCT Botany description of bog
Photos of pond in 1912 and 1932

National Natural Landmarks in Connecticut
Geography of Litchfield County, Connecticut
Wetlands of Connecticut